The Elbert and Harriet Ward Ranch, in Custer County, South Dakota near Custer, South Dakota, was listed on the National Register of Historic Places in 1990.

It is located East of Elk Mountain, and south of U.S. Route 16.

Contributing resources include:
main house (c. 1932-34), a two-story building on a rock and cement foundation
root cellar (c. 1916-34)
milk house (c. 1916-34)
privy (c. 1916-34)
cistern (c. 1932-34), a rectangular "box" covered by a cement slab, at top of a hill, with capacity for 2,000 gallons
chicken coop (c. 1916-34)

References

Ranches in South Dakota
National Register of Historic Places in Custer County, South Dakota